Holy Trinity Church, located at Trinity circle at the east end of the MG Road, is a major landmark in Bangalore. It was built in 1851, for the British Regiment stationed in Bangalore. Built in the English Renaissance style, the church can accommodate 700 people and is regarded as the largest "military" church in southern India. It has a congregation of over 450 families

History
The East India Company decided to build a second church in Bangalore after protests from local English regiment in Bangalore. Bishop Corrie chose the spot of the church. The foundation stone was laid on 16 February 1848.  
The walls were lined with ornate marble murals and tablets, which spoke about great men and women who toiled for the church. Some of these statues were specially carved in England. Rev W W Lutyens designed the furnishing and embellishments. Mears Foundry of London cast the bell of the church, in 1847. The pulpit and pipe organ were also built in London. The pipe organ, though, was later sold to the Tamil Evangelical Lutheran Church.  The stained glass, depicting the baptism of Jesus in splendid color, and the baptismal pond were brought from London. Queen Victoria's own West Kent Regiment presented the cross, in memory of those who died when the unit was based in Bangalore.

The church was consecrated on 25 July 1852 and opened on 8 August, 1852.

After Independence, the church was taken over by the Christian Indian Military personnel and their families. It was called Holy Trinity Garrison Pastorate then. In 1965, it was renamed as Holy Trinity Church, by the Mysore Diocese.

Vintage Gallery

References

External links

Bangalore Civil and Military Station
Church of South India church buildings in India
Churches in Bangalore
History of Bangalore
Churches completed in 1851
19th-century Anglican church buildings
1851 establishments in India